Xe Xou River is a river in southeastern Laos. It flows through the Dong Ampham National Biodiversity Conservation Area of  Attapeu Province. The village of Ban Keng Maw lies on the river and is where boat trips are launched.

References

Rivers of Laos
Geography of Attapeu province